Albert Tan Que, Al Haj (died 2010s) was a Filipino politician who was mayor of Bongao, Tawi-Tawi from 2001 until 2010. He was the father of current Bongao mayor Jasper Shia Que. In 2007 he was re-elected.

References

External links

2010s deaths
Liberal Party (Philippines) politicians
Mayors of places in Tawi-Tawi
Filipino former Christians
Filipino Muslims